The redfin robber (Brycinus affinis) is a species of fish in the family Alestidae. It is endemic to Tanzania.  Its natural habitats are rivers and freshwater lakes.

References 

 Hanssens, M & Snoeks, J. 2005.  Alestes affinis.   2006 IUCN Red List of Threatened Species.   Downloaded on 3 August 2007.
 

Brycinus
Fish of Tanzania
Endemic fauna of Tanzania
Fish described in 1894
Taxa named by Albert Günther
Taxonomy articles created by Polbot